This is a list of presidents of the History of Medicine Society of the Royal Society of Medicine.

Numerous distinguished authors and historians became presidents and many more were invited to speak.

1912-1931

1931-1960

1960-1990

1990 onwards

References

History of medicine
Lists of presidents of organizations